Yuejiang Tower is situated on the top of Shizishan (Lion Mountain) to the northwest of downtown Nanjing, Jiangsu. The river referred to its name is the Yangtze River, which may be viewed to the north, while central Nanjing can be viewed to the south.

In 1360, Zhu Yuanzhang defeated Chen Youliang’s 400,000 forces with his 80,000 army in Lu Longshan, which set up the basis for the reign of Ming Dynasty and for taking Nanjing as the capital. After proclaiming himself as the emperor, Zhu Yuanzhang changed Lu Longshan as the Lion Mountain in 1374. He ordered to build the Yuejiang Tower on top of the mountain and wrote the Note on Yuejiang Tower in person, although the tower was never built.

Yuejiang Tower was built first time and opened to the outside world in 2001. With its distinct style of Ming Dynasty and classical royal makings, it is regarded as one of the Four Major Famous Buildings in Jiangnan with Yellow Crane Tower, Tengwang Pavilion and Yueyang Tower included.

References

 
 

Towers in China
Buildings and structures in Nanjing
Tourist attractions in Nanjing
Traditional Chinese architecture